Les Herring (8 June 1909 – 29 April 1967) was  a former Australian rules footballer who played with Footscray in the Victorian Football League (VFL).

Notes

External links 
		

1909 births
1967 deaths
Australian rules footballers from Victoria (Australia)
Western Bulldogs players